Guatire is a city in Miranda, Venezuela.  In 2006, its population has been estimated at 200,417.  Today, Guatire has virtually merged with its neighbour, Guarenas forming the Guarenas-Guatire conurbation.

Located in Miranda State, and becoming part of "La gran Caracas" (Greater Caracas) because it is near Caracas (Venezuela's Capital).
San Pedro

Notable people
Francisco Álvarez (born 2001), professional baseball catcher for the New York Mets
Rómulo Betancourt (1908–1981), known as "The Father of Venezuelan Democracy", 47th and 54th President of Venezuela
Sara Bendahan (1906–1946), a physician and the first Venezuelan woman to complete her medical degree in that country
Leandro Cedeño (born 1998), baseball player
Miguel Pérez (born 1983), former professional baseball catcher for the Cincinnati Reds.
Régulo Rico (1877-1960), musician, conductor, composer, educator

References

Cities in Miranda (state)